Cootehill Railway Station was on the Dundalk and Enniskillen Railway in the Republic of Ireland.

The Dundalk and Enniskillen Railway opened the station on 10 October 1860.

It closed on 10 March 1947.

The old station and associated buildings now form Cootehill Livestock Mart.

Routes

References

Disused railway stations in County Cavan
Railway stations opened in 1860
Railway stations closed in 1947